Goods Island Light is an active lighthouse located on the highest point of Goods Island (Palilag), an island in the Torres Strait, belonging to Queensland, Australia. It serves as the rear light of the Goods Island Range, pointing out the entrance to Normanby Sound.

History
The first navigation aid on Goods Island was a signalling station, established in 1877. In 1882, pearl fishers operating in Torres Strait requested that a light be established at the western entrance to the straight. Their request was accepted by George Heath, chairman of the Queensland Marine Board, who dictated the location of Goods Island. A temporary light installed on the signalman's quarters was finally replaced by the lighthouse, constructed in 1886. It was the third in a group of eight lighthouses in Queensland made of hardwood frame clad with corrugated iron, which includes, in order of establishment Little Sea Hill Light, Grassy Hill Light, itself, Bay Rock Light, Old Caloundra Light, North Point Hummock Light (demolished), Gatcombe Head Light (demolished) and Bulwer Island Light. The lighthouse was constructed entirely by government workers, rather than a private contractor, and it is believed to be unique in this sense among Queensland lighthouses. The original apparatus was a fourth order dioptric with a totally reflecting glass mirror.

In 1894 telegraphic communication with Thursday Island was established. Following the Federation of Australia, the station was transferred to the hands of the Commonwealth of Australia.

During World War II the island was taken over by the Royal Australian Navy which constructed defensive batteries around the island.

In 1973 the lighthouse was automated. In 1988 it was transferred to solar power.

Structure
It is conical in shape, made of hardwood frame clad with white painted corrugated iron. It is topped by a red zinc dome. Access to the tower is through concrete steps and a small corrugated iron entryway with a convex corrugated iron roof.

Also part of the station is the front light, a  white hut on a rock platform below. The lighthouse is located 505 meters at 199° from this front light.

Also in the premises are a timber storage shed a timber fibro-cement clad lighthouse keeper's cottage, now in ruins. Both of them are white with green painted galvanized iron roofs.

Display

The front light shows white and red flashes every two and a half seconds (Fl.W.R. 2.5s). The front light is obscured by Hammond Island and by Goods Islands itself.

Operation and access
The site and the light are managed and operated by the Australian Maritime Safety Authority. The island is accessible only by boat, and both the site and the tower are closed to the public.

See also

 List of lighthouses in Australia

Notes

References

, seems to use almost identical text as the above.

External links

 
 

Lighthouses completed in 1886
Lighthouses in Queensland
Queensland places listed on the defunct Register of the National Estate
Commonwealth Heritage List places in Queensland
1886 establishments in Australia
Torres Strait
Queensland in World War II